The Max Planck Institute for the Study of Religious and Ethnic Diversity (German: Max-Planck-Institut zur Erforschung multireligiöser und multiethnischer Gesellschaften) is located in Göttingen, Germany. It is one of 83 institutes in the Max Planck Society (Max-Planck-Gesellschaft).

History
The MPI for the Study of Religious and Ethnic Diversity is the successor of the Kaiser Wilhelm Institute for German History previously established in 1917 in Berlin. Founded in 1956 as the Max Planck Institute for History, the institute  was renamed to its current form based on the decision of the Senate of the Max Planck Society in March 2007.

Research
The Max Planck Institute for the Study of Religious and Ethnic Diversity is one of the foremost centers for the multi-disciplinary study of diversity, in its multiple forms, in today’s globalizing world. As societies across the globe become ever more diverse, pressing new challenges emerge to the fore, motivating the study of questions such as the relationship between mobility and inequality; the interaction of globalization, religious diversity, and the secular state; the legal boundaries of cultural accommodation; global cities and super-diversity within them; new forms of membership and belonging; and the trans-bordering networking of ethnic and religious minorities. These thematic clusters provide a glimpse into the foundational queries that animate the rigorous scholarly investigation pursued by researchers at the Institute through a variety of disciplinary perspectives, including, but not limited to, anthropology, sociology, political science, and law.

Departments

Ethics, Law and Politics
The department, led by Ayelet Shachar, focuses on questions of citizenship, identity, and mobility are at the frontiers of scholarly research. Researchers at the department explore these developments and ask foundational questions, cutting across traditional disciplinary lines, with special emphasis placed on three interrelated themes: the relationship between diversity and equality in public law and private dispute resolution; the legal construction of borders and membership boundaries; and the intersection of states and markets in defining “who belongs“ within the political community, according to what criteria, and with what implications for shaping new disparities of mobility and opportunity at a time of profound and rapid migration and globalization pressures. The focus is on cutting-edge theoretical and legal puzzles; comparative approaches and international collaboration are strongly encouraged.

Religious Diversity
The department, led by Peter van der Veer, offers a research program developed within the ideographic tradition of anthropology and religious studies and thus allows for quite a variety of individual projects that try to answer questions that are not predetermined by theoretical models but developed in ethnographic or micro-sociological fieldwork. To contain this variety, a regional focus on South, South-East and East Asia has been chosen because of the importance of this region in terms of its share in the world’s population and with the assumption that comparisons can be fruitfully made across this region. This is because common civilizational histories as well as common histories of imperialism and cold war politics have transformed the religious traditions of Hinduism, Buddhism, Confucianism, Daoism, Islam and Christianity into "modern religions" in the Western sense. From the start, concerted efforts have been made to create collaborations with research institutions and researchers in the societies in which fieldwork projects are carried out.

Socio-Cultural Diversity
The department, led by Steven Vertovec, is devoted to comparative empirical investigation and theoretical development surrounding various modes and manifestations of migration-driven diversity and superdiversity. The categories of diversity most relevant to their research interests are race and ethnicity, religion, gender, class, migration channel and migration status. Moreover, they are particularly interested in the ways and processes by which patterns of migration-driven diversity are related to other modes of increasing social, cultural, economic and political differentiation.

References

External links
 Homepage 
 Homepage 

Religious And Ethnic Diversity
Social science institutes